This is a list of transfers involving clubs that played in the League of Ireland Premier Division and League of Ireland First Division.

Pre-Season Transfers

Bohemians

In:

Out:

Cork City

In:

Out:

Derry City

In:

Out:

Drogheda United

In:

Out:

Dundalk

In:

Out:

Shamrock Rovers

In:

Out:

Shelbourne

In:

Out:

Sligo Rovers

In:

Out:

St Patrick's Athletic

In:

Out:

UCD

In:

Out:

First Division

Athlone Town

In:

Out:

Bray Wanderers

In:

Out:

Cobh Ramblers

In:

Out:

Finn Harps

In:

Out:

Galway United

In:

Out:

Kerry

In:

Out:

Longford Town

In:

Out:

Treaty United

In:

Out:

Waterford

In:

Out:

Wexford

In:

Out:

References

Ireland
League of Ireland
Transfers
Lists of Republic of Ireland football transfers